"Bitter Sweet Symphony" is a song by the English rock band the Verve, from their third studio album, Urban Hymns (1997). It was produced by Youth and released on 16 June 1997 by Hut Recordings and Virgin Records as the album's lead single.

"Bitter Sweet Symphony" is based on a sample from a 1965 version of the Rolling Stones song "The Last Time" by the Andrew Oldham Orchestra. The Verve added strings, guitar, percussion and vocals. They obtained rights to use the "Last Time" sample from the copyright holder, Decca Records, but were denied permission from the Rolling Stones' former manager, Allen Klein. Following a lawsuit, the Verve relinquished all royalties and the Rolling Stones members Mick Jagger and Keith Richards were added to the songwriting credits. In 2019, after Klein's death, Jagger, Richards and Klein's son ceded the rights to the Verve songwriter Richard Ashcroft. 

The music video features Ashcroft walking down a busy pavement in Hoxton, London, bumping into passersby. It was played frequently on music channels and was nominated for several awards. The music video was nominated for Video of the Year, Best Group Video, and Best Alternative Video at the 1998 MTV Video Music Awards. 

"Bitter Sweet Symphony" reached number two on the UK Singles Chart, and stayed on the chart for three months. It was released in the US in March 1998 by Virgin Records America, reaching number 12 on the Billboard Hot 100. It was named Rolling Stone and NME Single of the Year and was nominated for Best British Single at the 1998 Brit Awards. In 1999, it was nominated for the Grammy Award for Best Rock Song. "Bitter Sweet Symphony" is considered one of the defining songs of the Britpop era and has been named one of the greatest songs of the decade by several publications. Rolling Stone included "Bitter Sweet Symphony" in two editions of its "500 Greatest Songs of All Time".

Writing and recording 
"Bitter Sweet Symphony" is based on a sample of a 1965 orchestral version of the Rolling Stones song "The Last Time" by the Andrew Oldham Orchestra. The group was formed by Andrew Loog Oldham, the former producer and manager of the Rolling Stones, who enlisted musicians to create symphonic versions of Rolling Stones songs. The strings in the sample were written and arranged by David Whitaker. 

The Verve songwriter Richard Ashcroft heard the Andrew Oldham Orchestra version of "The Last Time" and thought it could be "turned into something outrageous". The Verve sampled and looped four bars, then added dozens more tracks, including strings, guitar, percussion and several layers of vocals from Ashcroft. Ashcroft said he imagined "something that opened up into a prairie-music kind of sound", similar to the work of the Italian composer Ennio Morricone, and that "the song started morphing into this wall of sound, a concise piece of incredible pop music". He likened the use of the sample to the golden age of hip hop: "To take something but really twist it and fuck it up into something else. Take it and use your imagination."

The strings that open "Bitter Sweet Symphony" were arranged by Wil Malone based on the melody in the sample. Malone expanded on the melody to add "bounce" and "jump". The strings were recorded in Olympic Studios, London, and performed by a group of 24 players. Malone instructed them to "make the strings tough, determined, not pretty, not to make them poetic". He observed that the song is built on a single chord, and likened it to Arabic music. Jon Wiederhorn of Rolling Stone wrote that the song "intertwines baroque strings worthy of Pachalbel with sedated vocals and shimmering guitar lines".

"Bitter Sweet Symphony" was produced by Youth at Olympic Studios. According to Youth, Ashcroft initially recorded a version with the producer John Leckie but did not proceed with it; Youth persuaded him to record another version. Youth said: "It was only once we'd put strings on it that he started getting excited. Then, towards the end, Richard wanted to chuck all the album away and start again. What was my reaction? Horror. Sheer horror. All I could say was, I really think you should reconsider."

Credits dispute
The Verve negotiated rights to use the "Last Time" sample from the copyright holder, Decca Records. However, they did not obtain permission from the Rolling Stones' former manager Allen Klein, who owned the copyrights to their pre-1970 songs, including "The Last Time". When "Bitter Sweet Symphony" was about to be released as a single, Klein, then the head of ABKCO Records, refused clearance for the sample, saying the Verve had used a larger portion than agreed. According to the Verve's guitarist, Nick McCabe, the dispute actually depended not on the sample but Ashcroft's vocal melody, which a musicologist determined was a half-time version of the Rolling Stones' "Last Time" melody. 

The Verve's co-manager, Jazz Summers, contacted their American record label, Virgin Records, for help. Virgin played "Bitter Sweet Symphony" for the Rolling Stones members Mick Jagger and Keith Richards; they liked the track, but declined to become involved in the dispute. Summers also sent a copy to Loog Oldham, the Rolling Stones' ex-manager, who wrote back: "Fair cop! Absolute total pinch! You can see why [ABKCO are] rolling up their sleeves." Following a lawsuit, the Verve relinquished all royalties to Klein and the songwriting credits were changed to Jagger–Richards. Ashcroft received $1,000; his co-manager, John Kennedy, described it as "one of the toughest deals in music history". According to the Verve's bassist, Simon Jones, the Verve were told they would be given half the royalties, but when the single began selling well, they were instructed to relinquish 100% of the royalties or remove it from sale. 

Rolling Stone wrote that the outcome was "patently absurd", noting that Jagger and Richards were not involved with the sample or Ashcroft's melody and lyrics. Ashcroft said sarcastically that "Bitter Sweet Symphony" was "the best song Jagger and Richards have written in 20 years", and that it was the Rolling Stones' biggest UK hit since "Brown Sugar" (1971). Asked in 1999 whether he believed that the situation was fair, Richards said: "I'm out of whack here, this is serious lawyer shit. If the Verve can write a better song, they can keep the money." David Whitaker, who wrote the string line in the "Last Time" sample, said in 2001: "The whole thing just makes one a bit sick, really."

In 1998, "Bitter Sweet Symphony" was used in a television advertisement for Nike. According to a statement released by the Verve's management, the Verve had a policy against licensing their music to advertising and would not have consented had they retained the rights to the song. As Virgin retained the synchronisation rights, the Verve received a percentage of the money earned from the advertisement. In 1999, Loog Oldham sued ABKCO, saying he was owed up to £1 million in mechanical royalties for the use of the "Last Time" sample.

Return of credits to Ashcroft 
Billboard estimated that "Bitter Sweet Symphony" had generated almost $5 million in publishing revenue by 2019. In 2018, Ashcroft expressed his anger over the situation, saying: "Someone stole God-knows-how-many million dollars off me in 1997, and they've still got it ... Anyone, unless you are mentally ill, will always remember the day when 50 million dollars was stolen off them." He said he intended to pursue the matter with Klein's son, Jody, who had become the head of ABKCO following Klein's death in 2009. 

In early 2019, Ashcroft's managers approached Jody Klein. He connected them to the Rolling Stones' manager, Joyce Smyth, who agreed to speak to Jagger and Richards. That April, ABKCO, Jagger and Richards agreed to return the "Bitter Sweet Symphony" royalties and songwriting credits to Ashcroft. Ashcroft announced the agreement in May, when he received the Ivor Novello Award for Outstanding Contribution to British Music from the British Academy of Songwriters, Composers, and Authors. He said it was a "kind and magnanimous" move, and said: "I never had a personal beef with the Stones. They've always been the greatest rock and roll band in the world. It's been a fantastic development. It's life-affirming in a way." In a statement, the Rolling Stones said they acknowledged the financial and emotional cost of "having to surrender the composition of one of your own songs".

Music video

The "Bitter Sweet Symphony" music video was directed by Walter Stern and released on 11 June 1997. In the video, Ashcroft walks down a busy pavement in Hoxton, London, refusing to change his pace, gait, or direction and therefore bumping into passersby. The other Verve band members join him and walk down the street into the distance. Critics likened it to the 1991 Massive Attack video "Unfinished Sympathy", which sees the singer Shara Nelson walking on a street in Los Angeles.

The music video was played a lot on music channels and was nominated for a number of awards, including three MTV Awards at the 1998 MTV Video Music Awards. The British comedy band Fat Les released a parody of the video for their 1998 song "Vindaloo", in which Paul Kaye is mocked by a growing group of passersby. In 2016, The Telegraph named Hoxton Street in its list of the 54 locations that defined the Britpop era. In 2016, the Guardian journalist Perry Francesca included the video in a list of the best music videos about city life. Francesca observed that "Hoxton Street in the late '90s was just on the cusp before the area underwent rapid gentrification and hipsterisation, so the video has become a kind of historic snapshot".

Legacy
"Bitter Sweet Symphony" is regarded as the Verve's signature song and one of the defining songs of the Britpop era. It has been featured in a number of best-ever song lists and polls. It was named Rolling Stone and NME Single of the Year for 1997. In 1998, BBC Radio 1 listeners voted it the third on the Best Track Ever list. That same year, it was named the third-best single of 1997 by New York City weekly The Village Voices Pazz & Jop annual critics' poll. In a 2005 Channel 4 poll, the music video was ranked eighth on a list of the 100 Greatest Pop Videos. The song received further exposure when it was used in adverts for Vauxhall and Nike.

On 2 July 2005, at the Live 8 concert in Hyde Park, London, Coldplay invited Ashcroft to perform the song with them during their set. They played it after only one rehearsal in Crystal Palace. Coldplay's singer, Chris Martin, introduced Ashcroft as "the best singer in the world" and described the song as "probably the best song ever written".

In 2007, NME placed the song at number 18 in its list of the "50 Greatest Indie Anthems Ever". In September 2007, a poll of 50 songwriters in Q placed it in a list of the "Top 10 Greatest Tracks." In the Australian Triple J Hottest 100 of All Time, 2009, the track was voted the 14th-best song of all time. Pitchfork named it the 29th best track of the 90s, and included it in the 2008 book The Pitchfork 500. In 2011, NME placed it at number 9 on its "150 Best Tracks of the Past 15 Years" list. Though the Verve have several hit singles, Paste named it the best one-hit wonder of the 1990s. Rolling Stone included "Bitter Sweet Symphony" at number 382 in its 2004 list of the "500 Greatest Songs of All Time" and at number 392 in its 2010 list. In 2015, Rolling Stone readers voted it the third greatest Britpop song in a poll (after "Common People" by Pulp and "Don't Look Back in Anger" by Oasis).

Track listings

 UK CD1 and cassette single 
 "Bitter Sweet Symphony" (original)
 "Lord I Guess I'll Never Know"
 "Country Song"
 "Bitter Sweet Symphony" (radio edit)

 UK CD2 
 "Bitter Sweet Symphony" (extended version)
 "So Sister"
 "Echo Bass"

 UK 12-inch single 
A1. "Bitter Sweet Symphony (original)
A2. "Lord I Guess I'll Never Know"
B1. "Bitter Sweet Symphony" (James Lavelle mix)
B2. "Country Song"

 European CD single 
 "Bitter Sweet Symphony" (radio edit)
 "So Sister"

 US CD and cassette single 
 "Bitter Sweet Symphony" (original) – 5:58
 "Lord I Guess I'll Never Know" – 4:50
 "So Sister" – 4:10
 "Echo Bass" – 6:38

Charts

Weekly charts

Year-end charts

Certifications

Release history

References

1997 songs
1997 singles
The Verve songs
Baroque pop songs
Hut Records singles
Music videos directed by Walter Stern
Number-one singles in Scotland
Sampling controversies
Song recordings produced by Chris Potter (record producer)
Songs about loneliness
Songs involved in royalties controversies
Songs written by Richard Ashcroft
Virgin Records singles